In axiomatic set theory, the Rasiowa–Sikorski lemma (named after Helena Rasiowa and Roman Sikorski) is one of the most fundamental facts used in the technique of forcing. In the area of forcing, a subset E of a poset (P, ≤) is called dense in P if for any p ∈ P there is e ∈ E with e ≤ p. If D is a family of dense subsets of P, then a filter F in P is called D-generic if

F ∩ E ≠ ∅ for all E ∈ D.

Now we can state the Rasiowa–Sikorski lemma:

Let (P, ≤) be a poset and p ∈ P. If D is a countable family of dense subsets of P then there exists a D-generic filter F in P such that p ∈ F.

Proof of the Rasiowa–Sikorski lemma 
The proof runs as follows: since D is countable, one can enumerate the dense subsets of P  as D1, D2, …. By assumption, there exists p ∈ P. Then by density, there exists p1 ≤ p with p1 ∈ D1. Repeating, one gets … ≤ p2 ≤ p1 ≤ p with pi ∈ Di. Then G = { q  ∈ P: ∃ i, q ≥ pi} is a D-generic filter.

The Rasiowa–Sikorski lemma can be viewed as an equivalent to a weaker form of Martin's axiom. More specifically, it is equivalent to MA().

Examples 
For (P, ≤) = (Func(X, Y), ⊇), the poset of partial functions from X to Y, reverse-ordered by inclusion, define Dx = {s ∈ P: x ∈ dom(s)}. If X is countable, the Rasiowa–Sikorski lemma yields a {Dx: x ∈ X}-generic filter F and thus a function F: X → Y.
If we adhere to the notation used in dealing with D-generic filters, {H ∪ G0: PijPt} forms an H-generic filter.

See also

References

External links 
 Timothy Chow's paper A beginner’s guide to forcing is a good introduction to the concepts and ideas behind forcing.

Forcing (mathematics)
Lemmas in set theory